In mathematics, a measurable cardinal is a certain kind of large cardinal number. In order to define the concept, one introduces a two-valued measure on a cardinal , or more generally on any set. For a cardinal , it can be described as a subdivision of all of its subsets into large and small sets such that  itself is large,  and all singletons  are small, complements of small sets are large and vice versa. The intersection of fewer than  large sets is again large.

It turns out that uncountable cardinals endowed with a two-valued measure are large cardinals whose existence cannot be proved from ZFC.

The concept of a measurable cardinal was introduced by Stanislaw Ulam in 1930.

Definition 
Formally, a measurable cardinal is an uncountable cardinal number κ such that there exists a κ-additive, non-trivial, 0-1-valued measure on the power set of κ. (Here the term κ-additive means that, for any sequence Aα, α<λ of cardinality λ < κ, Aα being pairwise disjoint sets of ordinals less than κ, the measure of the union of the Aα equals the sum of the measures of the individual Aα.)

Equivalently, κ is measurable means that it is the critical point of a non-trivial elementary embedding of the universe V into a transitive class M. This equivalence is due to Jerome Keisler and Dana Scott, and uses the ultrapower construction from model theory. Since V is a proper class, a technical problem that is not usually present when considering ultrapowers needs to be addressed, by what is now called Scott's trick.

Equivalently, κ is a measurable cardinal if and only if it is an uncountable cardinal with a -complete, non-principal ultrafilter.  Again, this means that the intersection of any strictly less than κ-many sets in the ultrafilter, is also in the ultrafilter.

Properties 
Although it follows from ZFC that every measurable cardinal is inaccessible (and is ineffable, Ramsey, etc.), it is consistent with ZF that a measurable cardinal can be a successor cardinal.  It follows from ZF + axiom of determinacy that ω1 is measurable, and that every subset of ω1 contains or is disjoint from a closed and unbounded subset.

Ulam showed that the smallest cardinal κ that admits a non-trivial countably-additive two-valued measure must in fact admit a κ-additive measure.  (If there were some collection of fewer than κ measure-0 subsets whose union was κ, then the induced measure on this collection would be a counterexample to the minimality of κ.)  From there, one can prove (with the Axiom of Choice) that the least such cardinal must be inaccessible.

It is trivial to note that if κ admits a non-trivial κ-additive measure, then κ must be regular.  (By non-triviality and κ-additivity, any subset of cardinality less than κ must have measure 0, and then by κ-additivity again, this means that the entire set must not be a union of fewer than κ sets of cardinality less than κ.)  Finally, if λ < κ, then it can't be the case that κ ≤ 2λ.  If this were the case, then we could identify κ with some collection of 0-1 sequences of length λ.  For each position in the sequence, either the subset of sequences with 1 in that position or the subset with 0 in that position would have to have measure 1.  The intersection of these λ-many measure 1 subsets would thus also have to have measure 1, but it would contain exactly one sequence, which would contradict the non-triviality of the measure.  Thus, assuming the Axiom of Choice, we can infer that κ is a strong limit cardinal, which completes the proof of its inaccessibility.

If κ is measurable and p∈Vκ and M (the ultrapower of V) satisfies ψ(κ,p), then the set of α < κ such that V satisfies ψ(α,p) is stationary in κ (actually a set of measure 1). In particular if ψ is a Π1 formula and V satisfies ψ(κ,p), then M satisfies it and thus V satisfies ψ(α,p) for a stationary set of α < κ. This property can be used to show that κ is a limit of most types of large cardinals that are weaker than measurable. Notice that the ultrafilter or measure witnessing that κ is measurable cannot be in M since the smallest such measurable cardinal would have to have another such below it, which is impossible.

If one starts with an elementary embedding j1 of V into M1 with critical point κ, then one can define an ultrafilter U on κ as { S⊆κ : κ∈j1(S) }. Then taking an ultrapower of V over U we can get another elementary embedding j2 of V into M2. However, it is important to remember that j2 ≠ j1. Thus other types of large cardinals such as strong cardinals may also be measurable, but not using the same embedding. It can be shown that a strong cardinal κ is measurable and also has κ-many measurable cardinals below it.

Every measurable cardinal κ is a 0-huge cardinal because κM⊆M, that is, every function from κ to M is in M. Consequently, Vκ+1⊆M.

Implications of existence
If a measurable cardinal exists, every  (with respect to the Borel hierarchy) set of reals has a Lebesgue measure. In particular, any non-measurable set of reals must not be .

Real-valued measurable 
A cardinal κ is called real-valued measurable if there is a κ-additive probability measure on the power set of κ that vanishes on singletons. Thus a cardinal is measurable if and only if it is real-valued measurable and strongly inaccessible. A real valued measurable cardinal less than or equal to  exists if and only if there is a countably additive extension of the Lebesgue measure to all sets of real numbers if and only if there is an atomless probability measure on the power set of some non-empty set.

 showed that existence of measurable cardinals in ZFC, real valued measurable cardinals in ZFC, and measurable cardinals in ZF, are equiconsistent.

Weak inaccessibility of real-valued measurable cardinals 
Say that a cardinal number  is an Ulam number if

whenever

then

Equivalently, a cardinal number  is an Ulam number if

whenever
 
  for 
  is -measurable for every 
then

The smallest infinite cardinal  is an Ulam number. The class of Ulam numbers is closed under the cardinal successor operation. In the von Neumann model of ordinals and cardinals, choose injective functions

and define the sets

are disjoint.

is countable, and hence

Thus there is a  such that

If  then  Thus

There is a similar proof that the supremum of a set  of Ulam numbers with  an Ulam number is again a Ulam number. Together with the previous result, this implies that a cardinal that is not an Ulam number is weakly inaccessible.

See also 
 Normal measure
 Mitchell order
 List of large cardinal properties

Notes

Citations

References 
.
.
.
.
.
.
. A copy of parts I and II of this article with corrections is available at the author's web page.
.
.

Large cardinals
Determinacy